Dave Ryan (born 6 May 1983) is an English former professional boxer who competed from 2007 to 2016. He held the Commonwealth super-lightweight title from 2014 to 2015.

References

1983 births
English male boxers
Light-welterweight boxers
Living people
Boxers from Derby
Welterweight boxers